Niklas Sandberg (born 3 September 1978) is a retired Swedish centre-back who last played for Swedish Superettan club Brage.

He started his career in the Swedish top flight in AIK in 1996 but only played two games during two years. After a spell at Helsingborg he returned to Stockholm in 2001 to play at FC Café Opera. He played there for three years and then returned to AIK in 2004. In May 2007 he was traded to Romanian first league side CFR Cluj, becoming the first Swedish footballer ever to play in Liga 1.

Sandberg is tall and powerfully built, and thus physically strong and tough to beat in the air. He reads the game well and is a decent passer. Thus, he can also play as a defensive midfielder.

In December 2009, Niklas Sandberg approached Singapore's S League champions, SAFFC on his own accord and eventually signed for them. SAFFC has qualified for the 2010 AFC Champions League Group Stages and this would make Sandberg a player who has played in both UEFA and AFC Champions League in his entire career thus far.

Career highlights
Sandberg was capped twice by Sweden (2007). He played for Swedish AIK Stockholm from 1996 to 1998, and 2004 to 2007. Played in 1997 Uefa Cup Winners Cup quarter-final against FC Barcelona. Won Romania League title (2007–08) and Norway League title (2008) with CFR 1907 Cluj and Stabaek.

References

External links

 
 Niklas Sandberg Interview

1978 births
Living people
Swedish footballers
Sweden international footballers
Association football defenders
AIK Fotboll players
IK Sirius Fotboll players
Helsingborgs IF players
AFC Eskilstuna players
CFR Cluj players
Stabæk Fotball players
FK Haugesund players
Warriors FC players
IK Brage players
Allsvenskan players
Superettan players
Liga I players
Eliteserien players
Norwegian First Division players
Singapore Premier League players
Swedish expatriate footballers
Expatriate footballers in Romania
Expatriate footballers in Norway
Expatriate footballers in Singapore
Swedish expatriate sportspeople in Romania
Swedish expatriate sportspeople in Norway
Swedish expatriate sportspeople in Singapore
Footballers from Stockholm